Oxysemaphora is a genus of moths belonging to the subfamily Olethreutinae of the family Tortricidae.

Species
Oxysemaphora chionolitha (Meyrick, 1938)
Oxysemaphora hacobiani Horak, 2006
Oxysemaphora notialis Horak, 2006

See also
List of Tortricidae genera

References

External links
tortricidae.com

Tortricidae genera
Olethreutinae
Taxa named by Alexey Diakonoff